Kristijan Polovanec (born 10 October 1979) is a Croatian retired footballer who last played for NK Radnik Sesvete.

Club career
Polovanec previously played for Dinamo Zagreb, Istra, Varteks, Međimurje, Inter Zaprešić in the Croatian Prva HNL and with Slovenian club Koper.

He played two seasons with Libourne-Saint-Seurin in the French Ligue 2.

References

External links
 
 
 Kristijan Polovanec national team appearances at the Croatian Football Federation
 
 

1979 births
Living people
Footballers from Zagreb
Association football defenders
Croatian footballers
Croatia youth international footballers
Croatia under-21 international footballers
GNK Dinamo Zagreb players
NK Croatia Sesvete players
HNK Segesta players
NK Istra players
NK Varaždin players
NK Međimurje players
NK Inter Zaprešić players
MŠK Žilina players
FC Libourne players
FC Koper players
NK Sesvete players
Croatian Football League players
Slovak Super Liga players
Championnat National players
Slovenian PrvaLiga players
Croatian expatriate footballers
Expatriate footballers in Slovakia
Croatian expatriate sportspeople in Slovakia
Expatriate footballers in France
Croatian expatriate sportspeople in France
Expatriate footballers in Slovenia
Croatian expatriate sportspeople in Slovenia